Great Ring or variation, may refer to:

J.R.R. Tolkien's Legendarium
 Any of the fictional Rings of Power
 The One Ring (or Great Ring)

Other arts and entertainment
 The Great Ring of Arakko (Marvel Comics), a fictional government body
 Velikoye Koltso Award, part of the Aelita Prize for Russian science fiction writers
 Great Ring, a circle dance, that was once part of the Cotillion

Places
 Great Ring Canal, River Thames, England, UK; a canal ring
 Great Ring Road, Budapest, Hungary; a ring road
 , Ukraine; a ring road
 Grande Raccordo Anulare (GRA;), Rome, Italy; a ring road

Other uses
 Kinki Great Ring, a Japanese baseball team (now Fukuoka SoftBank Hawks)
 Henge, a neolithic structure
 stone circle

See also

 Ring (disambiguation)
 Great (disambiguation)